B & O Railroad Viaduct is a historic structure in Bellaire, Ohio, listed in the National Register of Historic Places on June 22, 1976.

History

Bridge
The B&O Railroad's first bridge across the Ohio River, built in 1857, served a rail line through Parkersburg, West Virginia. But the growing center of Chicago, Illinois, made a span between Benwood, West Virginia, and Bellaire more desirable.

In 1865, the B&O obtained the Central Ohio Railroad and later the Sandusky, Mansfield & Newark Railroad. These acquisitions linked Bellaire to the port of Sandusky on the shore of Lake Erie, and thence to Chicago. The proposal to build a bridge at Bellaire threatened a ferry business there, whose owners sought and obtained an injunction was filed in court. The railroad fought the injunction to the U.S. Supreme Court and won.

Discussions into the building of the bridge began in the late 1860s and it was decided that the bridge would be a long-span wrought-iron-truss. The design of the bridge was handled by Jacob Linville, president of the Keystone Bridge Co., which manufactured its trusses. The bridge was completed in 1871. The approaches are made of cut sandstone blocks that elevate the rail line to the recommended height. The bridge itself consists of all wrought-iron trusswork resting on six cut stone piers sunk into the river bed.

The bridge was featured in the 2010 film Unstoppable starring Denzel Washington and Chris Pine. Filming on the bridge in Bellaire ran from November 9 to 14, 2009.

Bridge spans

The spans to the bridge were completed in 1870. The span comes down from the north and curves at 6 degrees to the east. Each span contains 37 stones, representing the 37 states at the time of completion.

The span in Benwood contains stone piers with iron truss-work supporting the railway above. The span comes in from the south and curves 270 degrees to the west. The span traverses several manufacturing sites and comes within feet of West Virginia Route 2.

In total, the entire span contains  of masonry, the piers and abutments contain .

Historic uses
Rail-related

See also
List of bridges documented by the Historic American Engineering Record in Ohio
List of bridges documented by the Historic American Engineering Record in West Virginia
Unstoppable (2010 film)

Notes

External links

Benwood Bridge at Bridgehunter
Benwood Bridge at Bridges & Tunnels

National Register of Historic Places in Belmont County, Ohio
Railroad bridges on the National Register of Historic Places in Ohio
Railroad bridges in Ohio
Truss bridges in the United States
Historic American Engineering Record in Ohio
Historic American Engineering Record in West Virginia
National Register of Historic Places in Marshall County, West Virginia
Railroad bridges on the National Register of Historic Places in West Virginia
Bridges completed in 1871
Baltimore and Ohio Railroad bridges
Bridges over the Ohio River
Viaducts in the United States
Wrought iron bridges in the United States
Bridges in Belmont County, Ohio
Buildings and structures in Marshall County, West Virginia
1871 establishments in Ohio
1871 establishments in West Virginia
Interstate railroad bridges in the United States